"It's Christmas in Canada" (sometimes called "Christmas in Canada") is the fifteenth and final episode of the seventh season of the American animated series South Park and the 111th episode of the series. The episode originally aired on December 17, 2003 and was nominated for an Emmy Award. The episode parodies the film The Wizard of Oz.

In the episode, the Brovlofski family is dealt a devastating blow when Ike's Canadian birth parents show up unexpectedly, and want their baby back. When the townspeople decide to forgo Christmas gifts and take up a collection to get Ike home to South Park, the boys are distraught. Before all the money for their Christmas presents gets spent, they hightail it to Canada to bring Ike home themselves.

This was the final episode to feature Eliza Schneider's voice due to pay concerns.

Plot 
The Broflovski family is celebrating Hanukkah together when a Canadian couple, who introduce themselves as Harry and Elise Gintz, come to their house. Just as Harry begins explaining why they have sought out the Broflovskis, Kyle and Ike walk into view to see who is at the door and Elise immediately rushes in to hug Ike, who hides behind Kyle. While talking in the dining area, with Kyle and Ike outside listening in, Harry and Elise reveal they are Ike's biological parents, addressing him by his birth name "Peter". They gave Ike up during the Cola wars in Canada. Harry justifies their right to change their mind about putting Ike up for adoption as, due to a new law made by the Prime Minister of Canada, all Canadian-born children living in America must be returned to their biological parents. The Gintses depart, with the Broflovskis vowing to fight them in court. Sadly, the Canadian law cannot be overturned by South Park's court, so Ike is given to the Gintses. After Ike sadly leaves with his biological parents, Kyle notices his parents steadily getting worse as time without Ike goes on and attempts to get his friends to help him, but they have other things on their minds: Cartman believes that presents are more important, and Stan is obsessed with the Christmas adventures that he may have this year.

South Park's citizens decide to act kindly towards the Broflovskis and agree to give them their Christmas gift money to help fund their trip to Canada in order to talk to the Prime Minister. However, they do not take their kids into account and their decision leaves the kids upset with the thought of Christmas without any presents. Cartman blames it all on Kyle. Kyle has an idea of how to save Christmas: the boys can go to Canada and get Ike back themselves in the few days before Christmas, saving everybody's money for presents. Everyone else agrees, with Cartman threatening to fight Kyle if they don't get home in time for Christmas. They fly with City Airlines, run by City Wok owner Tuong Lu Kim. During the flight, the plane suffers from mechanical troubles and runs out of gas. Tuong parachutes from the plane, leaving the four boys inside. It crashes in Canada, but the boys get out relatively unscathed. Recovering, they meet a bunch of Canadians, including Scott, a Canadian who hates his own people and Americans, and is universally considered "a dick". Traveling to Ottawa on the "only road" in Canada, the boys meet others plagued by the new Prime Minister's laws, such as a Mountie named Rick, who is forced to ride a sheep instead of a horse; an unnamed French Canadian mime, who can no longer drink wine; and a Newfoundlander named Steve, who can no longer practice sodomy. In Newfoundland, Steve points out that they were heading in the wrong direction. However, they get there in enough time by using Steve's boat.

In the Centre Block of the Parliament Buildings, the boys ask for a guard to let them in, but he insists the Prime Minister sees nobody and slams the door. Steve and the mime turn around to go home, reasoning "We gave it our best, but our best wasn't good enough, eh?", but Kyle pleads with the guard, who says the Prime Minister is in China. Disappointed, the four boys sit on the steps and cry until the guard, now feeling sorry for them, admits he was lying and allows them entrance. The boys finally meet with the Prime Minister, a gigantic floating head who is a brutal dictator and refuses to repeal his laws. Scott then arrives with the Gintses, and, along with Kyle, appeal to the Prime Minister to support their separate views. The Prime Minister rejects Kyle's speech, and to prove his point, vaporizes Kenny. Stan reveals that the gigantic floating head is mechanically controlled by Saddam Hussein in a spider-hole. Upon discovery of the Prime Minister's true identity, the Canadians arrest Hussein (a reference to Hussein's actual arrest four days before the episode aired) and declare all of the new laws null and void. The Gintses realize how much Kyle must care for Ike to come all the way to Canada and they give Ike the choice to go back to America, which he accepts as he hugs Kyle. Cartman's watch goes off, and he is upset about missing Christmas, but Kyle insists that he got his brother back and that's all that matters; Cartman, however, gets angry and tries to fight Kyle. Kyle at first is reluctant but then hits Cartman only once (barely), causing Cartman to whine pathetically and cry for his mother, until Rick the Mountie invites the boys to celebrate Christmas Canadian-style, being part of a parade celebrating Hussein's capture and the boys' efforts to remove him from power. Oblivious to what just happened, Stan and Cartman (whose nose is bleeding as a result of the mere hit) are unhappy; Stan sighs and says that maybe they will have a better Christmas adventure next year.

Production
Saddam Hussein was caught the Sunday before this episode aired, on December 13, 2003, during Operation Red Dawn. This provided the perfect ending to the story. It was the seventh season's final reference to events in Iraq. "I think you could really call this the Iraq war season," Trey said.

References

External links

 "It's Christmas in Canada" Full episode at South Park Studios
 

Television episodes set in Canada
Canada–United States relations in South Park
American Christmas television episodes
Cultural depictions of Saddam Hussein
Works based on The Wizard of Oz
South Park (season 7) episodes